The abbreviation IADC may stand for:

Institute of Anthropology. Interdisciplinary Studies on Human Dignity and Care (IADC)
Inter-Agency Space Debris Coordination Committee
Inter-American Defense College
Inter-American Democratic Charter
International Advanced Database Conference
International Association of Drilling Contractors
"Inter-Agency Defense Command," on The New Adventures of Wonder Woman 
Internal Assessment and Documentation (Questionnaire)
Induced After-Death Communication, based on EMDR, cf. Dr. Allan Botkin, American psychologist